The Quingnam language was a pre-Columbian language that was spoken by the Chimú people, who lived in the former territories of the Mochicas: an area north of the Chicama Chao River Valley. At the height of Chimú conquests, the language was spoken extensively from the Jequetepeque River in the north, to the Carabayllo (near present-day Lima) in the south.

Fishermen along the Chimú coast spoke a language called Lengua Pescadora (fisherman language) by Spanish missionaries, and disambiguated as Yunga Pescadora by linguists; this may be the same as Quingnam. A letter found during excavations at Magdalena de Cao Viejo in the El Brujo Archaeological Complex includes a list of decimal numerals which may be Quingnam or Pescadora, but they are not Mochica.

The Quingnam language became extinct shortly after the arrival of the conquistadors. The core Chimú city, Chan Chan, was in the vicinity of the new Spanish city of Trujillo and became overwhelmed by it, with people needing to pick up the language of the conquerors for trade and survival.

Possible numerals
Below are numerals from an early 17th-century manuscript found at Magdalena de Cao (Quilter et al. 2010, as transcribed by Urban 2019). Although the manuscript does not indicate which language the numerals belong to, Quingnam is assumed to be the most likely candidate based on location and other clues:

{| class="wikitable sortable"
! Numeral !! Form
|-
| ‘1’ || chari
|-
| ‘2’ || marian
|-
| ‘3’ || apar
|-
| ‘4’ || tau
|-
| ‘5’ || himic (?)
|-
| ‘6’ || sut (?)
|-
| ‘7’ || canchen
|-
| ‘8’ || mata
|-
| ‘9’ || yucan
|-
| ‘10’ || bencor
|-
| ‘21’ || maribencor chari tayac
|-
| ‘30’ || apar bencor
|-
| ‘100’ || chari pachac
|-
| ‘200’ || mari pachac
|}

The numerals tau (4), sut (6), canchen (7), and pachac (100) are loanwords from a variety of Quechua II.

See also
Chimú culture

References

Languages of Peru
Unclassified languages of South America